Cellnex Telecom is a Spanish wireless telecommunications infrastructure and services company with up to 53,000 sites throughout Europe. Its activity is divided into four main areas: services for telecommunications infrastructures; audiovisual broadcasting networks; security and emergency network services; and solutions for the intelligent management of urban infrastructures and services (smart cities and Internet of things).

Franco Bernabè is the president of Cellnex Telecom after assuming the presidency of the company on July 25, 2019. Tobías Martínez, chief executive officer (CEO) and head of the company since November 2014, temporarily assumed the presidency of the company in February 2018 after the resignation of Francisco Reynés, who left office after being appointed CEO of Gas Natural Fenosa.

The company's legal headquarters have been located at the offices on Calle Juan Esplandiú in Madrid since October 2017 due to the 2017–2018 Spanish constitutional crisis. However, the majority of their employees remain in Barcelona and the board of directors has not ruled out returning the legal headquarters to Barcelona.

Cellnex Telecom had revenues of 901 million euros in 2018 and an EBITDA of 591 million. At the end of 2018, there were 1437 employees.

Cellnex Telecom is listed on the market of the Bolsa de Madrid and is part of the IBEX35. It is also part of the sustainability indices FTSE4GOOD, CDP (Carbon Disclosure Project) and Standard Ethics.

History 
In 2000, Acesa Telecom (later Abertis Telecom) acquired 52% of Tradia and merged into Abertis Telecom (now Cellnex Telecom). Three years later, after Auna was spun-off, Retevisión's audiovisual business became part of Abertis Telecom. In 2005, the deployment of Digital Terrestrial Television began in Spain, with a network that reached 80% population coverage carrying out the first tests in Madrid, Barcelona, Valencia, Zaragoza and Gijón. In 2006, the company was awarded the contract by which it became the operator of DTT signals for Spanish broadcasters with national coverage. In 2010, the “Analogue Blackout” occurred in Spain, after the complete digitization of Abertis Telecom network of centers. Between 2012 and 2013, the company acquired more than 2,500 telecommunication towers from Telefónica and Yoigo, and laid the foundations for its future position as a neutral operator. In 2014, it acquired TowerCo, an Italian telecommunications operator, which manages the mobile phone towers located in the entire motorway network of Italy, thus initiating the process of internationalization. That same year it deployed the first Internet of Things (IoT) network in Spain with Sigfox technology.

IPO 
Cellnex Telecom is the name which the company Abertis Telecom was renamed to prepare for its IPO. The company, a subsidiary of the Abertis company, officially changed its name on April 1, 2015, after being approved at the shareholders' meeting that took place on March 23, 2015. On April 24, it was made public that the company would debut on the stock market on May 7 of the same year, at a price that would range between 12 and 14 euros per share, estimating a market capitalization between 2.8 and 3.2 billion euros.

With the IPO of Cellnex Telecom, Abertis fulfilled one of the main objectives of the Strategic Plan 2015–2017, with which it intended to value its telecommunications business and obtain resources to invest in growth and international expansion of its highway division. The telecommunications subsidiary of Abertis marked its first crossing at 15.5 euros at the ringing of the bell that took place at 11 a.m. on May 6, 2015, on the Madrid Stock Exchange. The company's shares rose more than 10% in its first session, to 15.41 euros. Subsequently, its price fell slightly from those 15.5 euros. Cellnex marked an intraday minimum of 15 euros and a maximum of 15,695 euros.

Joining the IBEX 35 
The IBEX 35 Technical Advisory Committee, after the first ordinary review of the committee on Thursday, June 9, 2016, announced the departure of Sacyr and OHL from the index and its replacement by Cellnex Telecom and Viscofan. These changes happened on June 20, 2016. The index was adjusted at the close of the session on June 17.

Divisions 
Cellnex Telecom is present in four different areas:

 Telecommunications Infrastructure Services: The company has more than 24,000 locations and offers a set of services aimed at ensuring the conditions for a reliable  transmission for the broadcasting of content
 Audiovisual broadcasting networks: Cellnex offers DTT and radio coverage to 99% of the population in Spain
 Smart Cities, IoT & Security: The company has deployed the first Internet of Things (IoT) network in Spain, with Sigfox technology and coverage of 95% of the population. Likewise, Cellnex Telecom designs, deploys and operates networks that guarantee communications to security and emergency bodies, fleets of forest guards, civil protection and firefighters, among others.
 DAS & Small Cells: Cellnex Telecom facilitates broadband connectivity through DAS (Distributed Antenna System) and “small cells” systems for those mobile operators that require guaranteed coverage in spaces such as sports stadiums, shopping centers, airports, metro lines or railway stations.

Presence in Europe 
The company has thousands of mobile phone towers, being the first independent European operator in the management of telecommunications infrastructures. Cellnex Telecom is specialized in the deployment of networks prepared for 5G technology because of its presence in Europe, with nearly 53,000 sites – including small cells and Distributed Antenna Systems (DAS) – in seven European countries: Spain, Italy, the Netherlands, France, the United Kingdom, Switzerland and Ireland.

Cellnex Spain 
Cellnex Telecom has a network of telecommunications infrastructures in Spain of 8,832 operating sites distributed throughout the territory, which provide wide geographical coverage and allow it to offer services to mobile operators, broadcasters and administrations. Cellnex, as a neutral operator, offers all mobile operators the services necessary for the wireless transmission of data and content, allowing its customers a high degree of efficiency in the deployment of networks and positioning itself in the development of 5G networks.

Cellnex Italy 
Cellnex is the leading independent wireless telecommunications infrastructure operator in Italy. The 10,000 sites that Cellnex operates in Italy through its subsidiaries Galata and Towerco constitute one of the densest and most capillary networks that cover the entire Italian territory, positioning the company in a privileged situation to accompany the rapid deployment of new generation networks. CommsCon (another subsidiary) manages an additional 1,500 DAS nodes. Both Galata, Towerco and CommsCon, the companies through which Cellnex operates in Italy, work under the multi-operator and multi-service concept. Furthermore, in May 2019, Cellnex announced a new agreement with Iliad Italia whereby the company has acquired 2,200 new sites. In total, Cellnex has a network of 14,230 sites in Italy country.

Cellnex France 
Cellnex France was created in July 2016 after reaching an acquisition agreement with Bouygues Telecom. The agreement with the company, which includes the usage of sites until 2022, was renewed in February 2017 and December 2018 and has given Cellnex the means to be a significant operator in the service provision segment in the short term of infrastructures to French telecommunications operators. In addition, in May 2019, the company announced a new agreement with Iliad France with which it will manage the sites that are currently integrated into Free, a French voice and data operator. In total, Cellnex has a network of 13,750 sites in France.

Cellnex Netherlands 
Cellnex Telecom acquired Towerlink Netherlands B.V., Shere Masten B.V. in 2016 and Alticom B.V. in 2017. The three companies have more than 918 telecommunications sites for the distribution of mobile data communication and telecommunications. The main customers interested in telecom infrastructure services are the Dutch mobile network operators KPN, Vodafone, T-Mobile and Tele2. The sites are distributed throughout the country and are managed from their central Reeuwijk office.

Cellnex UK 
Cellnex acquired the telecommunications division of Arqiva in the United Kingdom, adding 8,300 locations to Cellnex in the British market. The agreement follows the announcement in June 2020 of a long-term strategic alliance with BT, through which Cellnex obtained the rights to commercialize and operate 220 high-rise towers distributed throughout the United Kingdom. This alliance entails the acquisition of around 7,400 owned sites and the marketing rights for an additional 900 sites spread throughout the UK. Cellnex thus became the main independent operator of wireless telecommunications infrastructures in the United Kingdom. The agreement also includes concessions for the use of street furniture for the deployment of telecommunications infrastructure in 14 boroughs of London.

Cellnex Switzerland 
Following the agreement with Salt in May 2019, Cellnex manages a portfolio of more than 6,000 sites and is permanently consolidated in Switzerland.

Cellnex Ireland 
In September 2019, Cellnex reached an agreement with InfraVia Capital Partners for the acquisition of the Irish telecommunications tower and site operator Cignal. The company currently operates 546 sites in Ireland, making it the seventh country in which Cellnex operates in Europe.

Cellnex Poland 

In October 2020 Cellnex bought passive infrastructure from P4 (PLAY)  later in February 2021 Cellnex bought passive and active infrastructure from Polkomtel Infrastruktura (PLUS GSM)

References 

IBEX 35
Telecommunications companies of Spain